Warwickshire was a parliamentary constituency in Warwickshire in England.  It returned two Members of Parliament (MPs), traditionally known as knights of the shire, to the House of Commons of the Parliament of the United Kingdom, elected by the bloc vote system.

History

Boundaries and franchise
The constituency, which seems first to have returned members to Parliament in 1293, consisted of the historic county of Warwickshire, excluding the city of Coventry which had the status of a county in its itself after 1451. (Although Warwickshire also contained the borough of Warwick and part of the borough of Tamworth, each of which elected two MPs in its own right for part of the period when Warwickshire was a constituency, these were not excluded from the county constituency, and owning property within the borough could confer a vote at the county election. This was not the case, though, for Coventry.)

As in other county constituencies the franchise between 1430 and 1832 was defined by the Forty Shilling Freeholder Act, which gave the right to vote to every man who possessed freehold property within the county valued at £2 or more per year for the purposes of land tax; it was not necessary for the freeholder to occupy his land, nor even in later years to be resident in the county at all.

Except during the period of the Commonwealth, Warwickshire has two MPs elected by the bloc vote method, under which each voter had two votes. (In the First and Second Parliaments of Oliver Cromwell's Protectorate, there was a general redistribution of seats and Warwickshire elected four members; the traditional arrangements were restored from 1659.)

Character
In the Middle Ages Warwickshire was mainly an agricultural county, but the realisation of the value of its mineral wealth, and eventually the coming of the Industrial Revolution, transformed its character. By the time of the Great Reform Act in 1832, Warwickshire had a population of approximately 337,000, of which 142,000 were in Birmingham and its suburbs; since Birmingham had been of little importance in medieval times it was not a borough, and was represented in Parliament only through Warwickshire's county members. The franchise being based on land ownership, the urban areas commanded a much smaller proportion of the votes than of the population: at the election in 1820 when Warwickshire recorded its highest turnout, only 399 of the 3,122 votes were cast in Birmingham, and a little under 300 in total from the other main towns (Warwick, Stratford-upon-Avon and Nuneaton).

Nevertheless, this gave the industrial and manufacturing interests some leverage, which they found necessary since the interests of the rest of the county were sometimes much at odds with their own. As a group of Birmingham manufacturers explained in 1780 letter to the Earl of Dartmouth (one of the most influential of the locally connected noblemen):
The various commercial regulations, so frequently made by the Legislature, affect the trade and manufacturers of this place very much and render it an object of great importance to its inhabitants that gentlemen may, if possible, be chosen for the county who are connected with the people, and not entirely uninformed of the particulars in which their interests consist.
- Letter published in the 13th Report of the Historical Manuscripts Commission, quoted by Porritt

In practice contested elections were rare: the general elections of 1705 and 1774 were the only ones of the 29 between 1701 and 1832 and which Warwickshire's two MPs were not elected unopposed. Elections were held at a single polling place, Warwick, and voters from the rest of the county had to travel to the county town to exercise their franchise; candidates were expected to meet the expenses of their supporters in travelling to the poll, making the cost of a contested election substantial. Potential candidates therefore preferred to canvass support beforehand and usually not insisting on a vote being taken unless they were confident of winning; at most elections, amicable negotiation had settled the outcome well in advance.

The representation was generally in the hands of the leading gentry of the county – notably the Mordaunts of Walton, who held one of the two seats for 82 of the 122 years between 1698 and 1820. But increasingly during the 18th century, it became necessary to defer to the preferences of the Birmingham freeholders in choosing between the available candidates. The 1774 election developed into a hard-fought contest when agreement could not be reached over who should replace Sir Charles Mordaunt, who had retired after forty years as the county's MP. After a poll that lasted 11 days, it was the nominee of the Birmingham interests, Sir Charles Holte of Aston, who emerged triumphant over Mordaunt's son. When Holte in his turn retired after one Parliament, the candidate chosen to replace him by the meeting of Birmingham freeholders was accepted by the county meeting without opposition, the other hopefuls being left to squabble over the one remaining seat.

Nevertheless, the choice remained one between the various gentry of the county, and by the early 19th century Birmingham had become one of the most vocal centres of agitation for parliamentary reform. This resulted in violent disruption of the 1830 Warwickshire election, even though the two candidates were unopposed. A mob from the Birmingham Union, 300 or 400 strong and accompanied by a band, invaded the hustings at Warwick and demanded assurances from the candidates that they would support reform. Peel regarded this "daring attempt to overawe the nomination of representatives at Warwick" as one of the most serious in a generally tumultuous election; yet it seems to have failed to intimidate the candidates, since one was already a reformer and the other refused to give any pledge of support.

Abolition
The constituency was abolished in 1832 by the Great Reform Act, which divided the county into two new divisions, North Warwickshire and South Warwickshire, as well as establishing Birmingham as a borough electing MPs in its own right.

Members of Parliament

1290–1640

1640–1832

Notes

References

Robert Beatson, A Chronological Register of Both Houses of Parliament (London: Longman, Hurst, Res & Orme, 1807) 
 Michael Brock, The Great Reform Act (London: Hutchinson, 1973)
D Brunton & D H Pennington, Members of the Long Parliament (London: George Allen & Unwin, 1954)
 John Cannon, Parliamentary Reform 1640–1832 (Cambridge: Cambridge University Press, 1972)
Cobbett's Parliamentary history of England, from the Norman Conquest in 1066 to the year 1803 (London: Thomas Hansard, 1808) 
 Maija Jansson (ed.), Proceedings in Parliament, 1614 (House of Commons) (Philadelphia: American Philosophical Society, 1988) 
 Lewis Namier & John Brooke, The History of Parliament: The House of Commons 1754–1790 (London: HMSO, 1964)
 J E Neale, The Elizabethan House of Commons (London: Jonathan Cape, 1949)
 J Holladay Philbin, Parliamentary Representation 1832 – England and Wales (New Haven: Yale University Press, 1965)
 Edward Porritt and Annie G Porritt, The Unreformed House of Commons (Cambridge University Press, 1903)

Parliamentary constituencies in Warwickshire (historic)
Constituencies of the Parliament of the United Kingdom established in 1290
Constituencies of the Parliament of the United Kingdom disestablished in 1832